The scuba equipment manufacturer AP Diving or Ambient Pressure Diving, formerly known as A.P.Valves, is at Water-Ma-Trout in Helston, Cornwall, England.
They produce a range of scuba and surface supplied diving equipment including buoyancy compensator jackets and the Inspiration diving rebreather range. Their products are very popular in Britain.

The firm started in 1969 making a valve to allow a diver to breathe from a stabiliser jacket buoyancy compensator's inflation cylinder. They progressed to making divers' adjustable buoyancy life-jackets and stabiliser jackets, and then other diving equipment such as rebreathers. and diving accessories etc.

They often exhibit at diving trade shows.

Product lines
"Inspiration" rebreathers have been in production since 1997. The earliest model, now known as the Inspiration classic, reached the end of its product support life  in April 2017 after 20 years. It has been superseded by more recent models using different electronic control systems, which are backwards compatible with the original architecture.
"Buddy" and "Commando" - recreational and military scuba buoyancy compensators. 
"Mk IV Jump Jacket" - a buoyancy compensator designed for use with surface supplied diving equipment.

Awards
In January 2018 Martin Parker, Managing Director of AP Diving, received the European Underwater Federation Lavanchy Award at the Boot Show in Düsseldorf.

References

External links
 A.P.Valves's website
 Google Earth view from the air
 Google Earth view on the ground

Diving engineering
Rebreather makers
Engineering companies of the United Kingdom
Diving equipment manufacturers
British brands
Underwater diving in the United Kingdom